Sebastián Carlos Cristóforo Pepe (born 23 August 1993) is a Uruguayan professional footballer who plays as a midfielder for Uruguayan Primera División club Peñarol.

Club career
Born in Montevideo, Cristóforo graduated in Peñarol's youth setup, being promoted by his coach Diego Aguirre in May 2011, due to club's obligations in 2011 Copa Libertadores. He made his professional debut on 29 May 2011, in a 2–2 home draw against Central Español.

Cristóforo scored his first professional goal on 29 February 2012, the last of a 4–1 home routing over Bella Vista. He soon earned a starting spot in the club, being a part of the team who won the 2012–13 season.

On 11 August 2013, Cristóforo signed a five-year contract with Sevilla FC. He made his La Liga debut on 14 September, starting in a 2–3 away loss against FC Barcelona. Cristóforo finished the campaign with 12 appearances, suffering a severe knee injury in March 2014.

On 27 August 2016, Cristóforo was loaned to ACF Fiorentina for one year, with a buyout clause. He signed permanently for the side in the following year, after 19 league matches.

On 31 August 2018, Cristóforo returned to Spain by signing with Getafe CF on a season-long loan. On 11 January 2020, he joined SD Eibar on loan with an obligation to purchase.

On 5 October 2020, Cristóforo signed a one-year contract for Segunda División side Girona FC. On 15 January 2022, after spending six months as a free agent, he signed a short-term deal with FC Cartagena, still in the Spanish second division.

On 16 July 2022, Peñarol announced the return of Cristoforo on a permanent deal until December 2023.

International career
In 2013 Cristóforo appeared with the under-20s in the year's FIFA U-20 World Cup in Turkey, being an important midfield unit as his country finished second.

Honours

Peñarol
Uruguayan First Division: 2012–13
Copa Libertadores: Runner-up 2011

Sevilla
UEFA Europa League: 2013–14, 2014–15, 2015–16

References

External links

1993 births
Living people
Footballers from Montevideo
Uruguayan footballers
Uruguay under-20 international footballers
Association football midfielders
Uruguayan Primera División players
Peñarol players
La Liga players
Segunda División players
Sevilla FC players
Getafe CF footballers
SD Eibar footballers
Girona FC players
FC Cartagena footballers
Serie A players
ACF Fiorentina players
UEFA Europa League winning players
Uruguayan expatriate footballers
Uruguayan expatriate sportspeople in Spain
Uruguayan expatriate sportspeople in Italy
Expatriate footballers in Spain
Expatriate footballers in Italy